Philip Uri Treisman is an American mathematician and mathematics educator.  He is the Director of the Charles A. Dana Center, and is a Professor of Mathematics at The University of Texas at Austin.  He is credited with pioneering the Emerging Scholars Program (ESP), aimed at helping students from underprivileged backgrounds excel in calculus and other courses in science.  The program was first implemented at the University of California, Berkeley and has now disseminated throughout college campuses across the United States.  His efforts to improve American education have been recognized by Newsweek, the Harvard Foundation and the MacArthur Foundation, among other publications and societies.

He graduated summa cum laude with a B.S. in Mathematics from the University of California, Los Angeles, and from the University of California, Berkeley with a Ph.D. in 1985.

Awards

 1987 Charles A. Dana Award for Pioneering Achievement in American Higher Education.
1992 MacArthur Fellows Program
2006 The Harvard Foundation's Scientist of the Year Award
2019 Yueh-Gin Gung and Dr. Charles Y. Hu Award

References

External links
"Dr. Philip Treisman Meets Isaac Newton in Surreal Space", Digital Writing & Research Lab, Amanda Dulcinea Cuéllar
"Philip Uri Treisman", Mathematics Genealogy Project
, Studying Students Studying Calculus: A Look at the Lives of Minority Mathematics Students in College

Living people
20th-century American mathematicians
21st-century American mathematicians
MacArthur Fellows
UC Berkeley College of Letters and Science alumni
University of Texas at Austin faculty
Year of birth missing (living people)